Palmer Township is a township in Northampton County, Pennsylvania.  The population of Palmer Township was 20,691 at the 2010 census.

Palmer Township is part of the Lehigh Valley metropolitan area, which had a population of 861,899 and was thus the 68th most populous metropolitan area in the U.S. as of the 2020 census.

The township is home to Easton Area High School, a large public high school.

History
The first known inhabitants of the area now known as Palmer Township were the Lenape Native Americans in the 17th century. German Moravian settlers built on land in the Palmer area in 1740. At the time, the area was part of Bucks County, Pennsylvania, which by the mid-18th century also included land now called Northampton County and Lehigh County. Northampton County separated from Bucks County on March 11, 1752. In 1754, Forks Township, which then also consisted of what is now Palmer Township, was incorporated in 1754 with a total population of about 50 inhabitants. On May 5, 1857, Palmer Township was formed out of the land area of Forks Township south and west of the Bushkill Creek; the original population of the township was about 1,300 people. The township was named after George Palmer, the Pennsylvania Surveyor General who surveyed the original township lines. The main activity of Palmer Township during its earliest years was providing access roads from the neighboring city Easton to surrounding communities, including Bethlehem, Freemansburg and Nazareth.

During the late 18th and early 19th centuries, the township included many stone houses near water, for purposes of power and water supply, and roads, to allow for trade. Among them were the Seipsville Hotel, which was built by the settler Peter Seip in 1760 at the crossroads of roads leading from Easton, Nazareth and Hecktown. Seip had purchased land along the west side of Old Nazareth Road; the area later became known as Seipsville in honor of Seip. The Seipsville Hotel was the first public house between Easton and Nazareth, and became a popular stagecoach stop for travelers passing through the Lehigh Valley. In 1977, the building (now known as the Seipsville Inn) was added to the National Register of Historic Places due to the significance of its architecture and engineering.

The township started to experience major growth after World War I and World War II as part of a general trend of population movement from nearby cities to the suburbs. In the early 1920s, subdivision activity along inter-city trolley lines led to a building spurt in Palmer Township, which doubled the population within 10 years. As a result, the township became seen as a desirable place to live for people who worked in other areas of the Lehigh Valley. The population saw further growth in the late 1940s and early 1950s due to the expansion of water lines and the development of low-income housing.

Geography
According to the U.S. Census Bureau, the township has a total area of 10.7 square miles (27.7 km2), of which 10.7 square miles (27.7 km2) is land and 0.09% is water. It is drained by the Lehigh River and Bushkill Creek into the Delaware River. Its villages include Highland Park, Old Orchard, Palmer Heights, Palmer Park, and Prospect Park (also in Bethlehem Township.)

Neighboring municipalities
Wilson (east)
Forks Township (east)
Tatamy (northeast)
Stockertown (north)
Lower Nazareth Township (west)
Bethlehem Township (west)
Easton (south and tangent to the east)

Transportation

U.S. Route 22 crosses Palmer Township east-to-west and interchanges in the township just west of Wilson with Pennsylvania Route 248, which connects Easton and Nazareth. North-to-south Pennsylvania Route 33 crosses the northwestern portion of Palmer, with an interchange at Tatamy Road within the township. Other local roads of note include east-to-west Freemansburg Road, William Penn Highway, Park Avenue/Hecktown Road, Northwood Avenue, and Main Street/Nazareth Road, and north-to-south 25th Street, Bushkill Drive, Greenwood Avenue, Tatamy Road, and Van Buren Road.

Demographics

As of the 1960 census, the population in Palmer Township was slightly more than 8,000. In 1969, a special federal census showed a population of 12,252, including 5,982 white males, 6,249 white females, seven non-white males and 14 non-white females. By 1970, the population further grew to 12,601, making it the third largest municipality in Northampton County. Between 1960 and 1970, the assessed value of the township jumped from $24 million to $42 million, and the township budget grew from $93,000 to about $1 million. Also throughout that decade, an average of 125 living units per year were constructed, with the average housing value falling between $23,000 and $25,000. In 1970, about 35 percent of the land was in agriculture, mostly in the northern portion of the township.

As of the census of 2000, there were 16,809 people, 6,716 households, and 4,895 families residing in the township.  The population density was 1,570.4 people per square mile (606.5/km2).  There were 6,865 housing units at an average density of 641.4/sq mi (247.7/km2).  The racial makeup of the township was 94.32% White, 2.14% African American, 0.06% Native American, 1.83% Asian, 0.02% Pacific Islander, 0.63% from other races, and 0.99% from two or more races. Hispanic or Latino of any race were 2.34% of the population.

There were 6,716 households, out of which 28.3% had children under the age of 18 living with them, 63.5% were married couples living together, 6.8% had a female householder with no husband present, and 27.1% were non-families. 23.6% of all households were made up of individuals, and 13.0% had someone living alone who was 65 years of age or older.  The average household size was 2.46 and the average family size was 2.91.

In the township, the population was spread out, with 21.6% under the age of 18, 4.9% from 18 to 24, 27.3% from 25 to 44, 25.6% from 45 to 64, and 20.6% who were 65 years of age or older.  The median age was 43 years. For every 100 females there were 93.4 males.  For every 100 females age 18 and over, there were 88.1 males. The median income for a household in the township was $55,419, and the median income for a family was $65,017. Males had a median income of $44,014 versus $30,675 for females. The per capita income for the township was $25,722.  About 2.6% of families and 3.7% of the population were below the poverty line, including 3.4% of those under age 18 and 6.3% of those age 65 or over.

Economy
A lack of water during the early days of Palmer Township limited the amount of farming that could be done, and industry was limited mainly to the Bushkill Creek waterways, where some form of power was available. Residents had to get water from hand dug wells because it was too difficult to find a source of water close to the surface of the ground. Other industries began to arise in the late 19th and early 20th centuries, including some iron ore excavation in the Fairview Knolls area and cement industry near the Tatamy area; also at this time, the Taylor Wharton and Treadwell Engineering were established in Palmer Township to manufacture equipment mainly for railroad use. Farming techniques gradually grew in the area, until by the late 1960s almost 50 percent of the township was in farm lands. The township saw new businesses in the mid 1960s, including ITT in 1964 and Acopian Corp., in 1965.

Public education
The township is served by the Easton Area School District and has a library branch that is part of the Easton Area Public Library. Students in grades nine through 12 attend Easton Area High School in Easton.

Infrastructure
When Palmer's major roadway system first started to develop in the 18th century, dictated largely by the trails leading from Easton to outlying communities. William Penn Highway, the first road built in Palmer in around 1755, led from Easton to Bethlehem. Likewise, Freemansburg Avenue leads from Easton to Freemansburg; Old Nazareth Road leads from Easton to Nazareth; Tatamy Road leads from Easton to Tatamy; and Hecktown Road and the Newburg Pike leads from Seipsville to Hecktown and Newburg. Greenwood Avenue, which runs between Freemansburg Avenue and William Penn Highway, was opened in the 1960s. At the time, township supervisor H. Robert Daws said, "The opening of this north-south artery in the center of the township benefits not only the township, but the whole area."

Notable people
Larry Holmes, also known as the "Easton Assassin," former boxing's heavyweight champion of the world
Mulgrew Miller, former jazz musician

References

External links

Palmer Township website

Townships in Northampton County, Pennsylvania
Townships in Pennsylvania